Time pressure may refer to:
 time trouble - nearing time control in a timed game such as chess
 Time pressure regions in spatial planning - delineation of regions in geography through correlation between space, time and activities given by Amartya Deb
 Time Pressure - a science fiction novel by Spider Robinson, and an independent sequel to Mindkiller
 Time & Pressure